Joseph E. Spinnato (born October 24, 1938) was appointed Acting Fire Commissioner of the City of New York by Mayor Edward I. Koch on October 22, 1982 upon the resignation of Fire Commissioner Charles J. Hynes, and was appointed the 25th Fire Commissioner on February 17, 1983. He served in that position until his resignation on October 20, 1987.  He continues to be active in public life and has held several governmental positions since.

References

External links 
 NYC bio

Spinnato, Joseph, E.
1938 births
Living people